Avraham Shmuel Rakanti (1888 – 3 March 1980) was a Greek-Israeli politician and journalist. In Greece he served as deputy mayor of Thessaloniki between 1925 and 1933, whilst in Israel he was a member of the Knesset for Herut between 1949 and 1951.

Biography
Born in Salonica in the Ottoman Empire, Rakanti studied in a heder. He became a member of the Mizrachi association, and in 1925 he joined the Revisionist Zionism movement, becoming head of the Greek branch. In the same year he became deputy mayor of Thessaloniki, a position he held until 1933. He also founded and edited the French language newspaper, Pro-Yisrael. In 1934 he made aliyah to Mandatory Palestine. A member of the Revisionist Zionist central committee, he was elected to the first Knesset in 1949 on the Herut list, but lost his seat in the 1951 elections. He died on 3 March 1980.

References

External links

1888 births
1980 deaths
Greek emigrants to Mandatory Palestine
Greek Jews
Greek journalists
Greek politicians
Herut politicians
Israeli people of Greek-Jewish descent
Sephardi Jews in Mandatory Palestine
Jewish Israeli politicians
Jews from Thessaloniki
Members of the 1st Knesset (1949–1951)
Recanati family
20th-century journalists